The Russian Empire at various times included the subdivisions known as krais, either formally or informally. Some of these krais were:
Caucasus Krai
Turkestan Krai
Privislinsky Krai
Uriankhaisky Krai
Western Krai
Northwestern Krai
Southwestern Krai

See also
Krais of Russia